The Theatre Royal, until 1807 the New Street Theatre, or, colloquially, New Theatre, was a 2000-seat theatre located on New Street in Birmingham, England. It was erected in 1774 and demolished in 1956.

The theatre was damaged by fire in 1792 (as a result of arson) and again in 1820, after which it was rebuilt. In 1897, W. S. Gilbert's The Fortune Hunter premiered at the theatre. The theatre was rebuilt again in 1902, designed by Ernest Runtz,  reopening in 1904 with 2200 seats. This building lasted until 1956 when it was closed and demolished. The Woolworth Building was then constructed on the site, seen today as the location of a branch of Boots and Bella Italia.

Two large coade stone medallions, from the front of the theatre, depicting David Garrick (on the viewer's left) and William Shakespeare, survive and are now displayed in the Library of Birmingham.

In June 1848, Charles Dickens' Amateur Theatrical Company performed at the theatre as part of Dickens' efforts to raise funds for the curatorship of William Shakespeare's house in Stratford-upon-Avon.

Showell's Dictionary of Birmingham records that on 16 February 1873 a boy fell from the gallery and died.

References

Bibliography and further reading 

 
 
 
 
 
 

Former theatres in Birmingham, West Midlands
1774 establishments in England
1956 disestablishments in England
Buildings and structures demolished in 1956
Demolished buildings and structures in the West Midlands (county)